Lachowicz is a Polish surname. Notable people include:

 Dionisio Lachovicz (born 1946), Brazilian Ukrainian Greek-Catholic hierarch
 Al Lachowicz (born 1960), an American former Major League Baseball pitcher
 Colleen Lachowicz (1964), an American politician and social worker from Maine 
 Jacek Lachowicz (born 1972), a Polish musician, author and producer
 Rachel Lachowicz (born 1964), an American artist based in Los Angeles, California  
 Robert Lachowicz (born 1990), an English professional ice hockey left winger 

Surnames of Polish origin
Polish-language surnames